Argyris Brebos (born 24 September 1996) is a Greek professional footballer who plays as a winger for Super League 2 club Proodeftiki.

References

1996 births
Living people
Super League Greece 2 players
Panelefsiniakos F.C. players
Enosi Panaspropyrgiakou Doxas players
Acharnaikos F.C. players
Apollon Larissa F.C. players
Association football wingers
Footballers from Athens
Greek footballers